Bitterwater is an unincorporated community in the Bitterwater Valley of San Benito County, California, United States.

Bitterwater Valley, located at the base of the Diablo Range mountains on a crucial earthquake, San Andreas Fault, was once the primary habitat of the giant California condors. Around 1946, DDT poison was introduced throughout that area to kill coyotes, prairie dogs, mountain lions, and other animals that ate crops or posed a threat to ranch or farm animals. As the condors ate the animals killed by DDT, they too vanished. Note that this is not the problem with DDT. DDT has a relatively low toxicity to animals is not used for that purpose. The preferred agent is strychnine and it is used in grains to poison ground squirrels or meat to poison predators which leads to its consumption by birds which are then consumed by carnivores and in turn consumed by birds of prey along with the poisoned squirrels. The reason DDT is insidious to birds is it affects their ability to metabolize calcium resulting in fragile eggs which seldom hatch. DDT makes it into the food change the same way as strychnine in that the insects and fish that are killed by it end up being consumed by any animal scavenging for food.

But as humans decimated the California Condor, they realized this and changed tactics.  Now the Bitterwater Valley in California is home to many condors.  No prairie dogs exist in Bitterwater but the digger squirrel is very pervasive in the area, as well as coyote, California badger, redtail hawks, and wild turkey.

Bitterwater valley was discovered by Edward Calhoun Tully during a sheep drive from Chihuahua Mexico to San Francisco California in the mid to late 1800s.

References

Unincorporated communities in California
Unincorporated communities in San Benito County, California